Szederke Sirián (born 1 June 1994 in Szeged) is a Hungarian handballer who plays for Siófok KC as a line player.

Achievements 
Nemzeti Bajnokság I:
Winner: 2013, 2014
Magyar Kupa:
Winner: 2013, 2014
EHF Champions League:
Winner: 2013, 2014

References

External links
 Szederke Sirán Profile on Győri ETO KC's Official Website

1994 births
Living people
Sportspeople from Szeged
Hungarian female handball players
Győri Audi ETO KC players